James Caughey (9 April 1810 – 30 January 1891) was a Methodist minister and evangelist who was active in the United States, England and Canada. An imposing and effective preacher, he conducted highly emotional revival meetings at which many of his audience were converted or reaffirmed their faith. This brought him into some conflict with the more respectable members of the Methodist church in Britain.

Life

James Caughey was born of Scottish parents in the north of Ireland on 9 April 1810.
His family immigrated to Troy, New York in the early 1820s.
In 1830, Caughey was employed there in a large flour mill.
Caughey was converted to Methodism at a revival in Troy in 1830, and in 1832 was accepted as a probationary preacher by the American Methodist Episcopal Church. 
In 1834, he received a deacon's orders and was made a minister in Burlington, Vermont. 
In 1835, Caughey made a three month evangelist campaign in Montreal.
In 1836, he was ordained as an elder of the Methodist Episcopal Church.
Caughey experienced a personal baptism of the Spirit in July 1839.
He moved to Quebec City in October 1840 and served as a minister there for three months, and then as a minister in Montreal.

Caughey left Montreal in March 1841 and traveled via Saint John, New Brunswick to Halifax, Nova Scotia, from where he sailed to England in late July 1841.
Caughey preached in Britain with much success from 1841 to 1847.
He mainly preached among Methodists in the midlands and north of England, and came to be called the "King of Revivalist Preachers".
During this spell in Britain, Caughey claimed that he saw "20,000 profess faith in Christ and 10,000 profess sanctification."
William Booth encountered Caughey in Nottingham during this period, and was later to found the Salvation Army.
Caughey aroused controversy, since his highly emotional evangelistic style clashed with the middle-class respectability of many members of the English Methodist church.
He left England reluctantly in 1847 at the urging of the church leadership.

Caughey returned to his base in Burlington, Vermont.
Caughey visited Toronto in late November 1851, and stayed there for almost eight months, preaching seven sermons a week.
In that period, 2,000 people were converted, including many non-Methodists, and the membership of Toronto's Wesleyan Methodist churches rose from 714 to 1,537. Until 1856, Caughey continued to spend each winter in the Canadas. He visited Kingston in the fall of 1852.
Hundreds of people came to hear him speak at the Sydenham Street Methodist Church, and it is said that he was directly responsible for almost four hundred conversions or experiences of sanctification. Caughey preached his last sermon at the church on 13 March 1853.
He had similar success in Hamilton in March 1853. In the following years he preached in Montreal, London, Ontario, Belleville and Brockville.

Caughey returned to Britain in 1857 for two years, with much success, and made further visits in 1860 and in the mid 1860s.
After his health failed, Caughey retired to Highland Park, New Jersey.
In 1886, he was visited there by his old pupil William Booth.
Caughey died in Highland Park on 30 January 1891 at the age of 80.

Beliefs and influence

Caughey belonged to the Holiness movement. He therefore thought that justification and sanctification, in which a person's sins were forgiven and they became pure in God's sight, could be obtained instantly from a seeker who requested them from God in faith. He would appeal to the unconverted to make a first commitment to God, and to the converted to make a re-committal so as to receive the fullness of God's blessing.

Caughey had an imposing figure and face, a forceful personality, a quick wit and great eloquence.
His example and influence laid the groundwork for the holiness and Pentecostal movements.
Caughey, like other American revivalists such as Charles Grandison Finney and Phoebe Palmer who preached in England in the 1840s, followed a "scientific" approach to converting sinners. 
They rented halls, advertised their meetings, preached and prayed for defined ends, encouraged sinners to confess openly at the communion rail, and trained their converts to bring others to the faith.
Caughey was the first professional evangelist to campaign in the Canadas, and established a model for successors such as Dwight L. Moody. He influenced young men such as Albert Carman and Nathanael Burwash to become ministers, and thus had lasting influence on the Methodist church in Canada.
However, Caughey is best known for his revival activity in Britain in the 1840s.
Through the guidance he gave to Booth and others he had huge influence on evangelism in that country.

Publications
Publications include:

References

Sources

External links
 
 Biography at the Dictionary of Canadian Biography Online

1810 births
1891 deaths
Christian revivalists
Canadian evangelicals
Canadian Methodist ministers
19th-century Methodists